Sidney Hayers (24 August 1921 – 8 February 2000) was a British film and television director, writer and producer.

Born in Edinburgh, Scotland, Hayers began his career as a film editor. Among the films he directed are Circus of Horrors (1960), the occult thriller Night of the Eagle (1962), a musical Three Hats for Lisa (1965), and the adventure films The Southern Star (1969) and The Trap (1966).

In British TV, his credits included The Persuaders! and The New Avengers; he later directed several American TV shows, including episodes of Magnum, P.I., The A-Team, Knight Rider, T. J. Hooker, Baywatch and The Famous Five.

Hayers died of cancer in 2000 in Altea, Spain. His wife was the actress Erika Remberg. He had two children, Susan and Robert from his first marriage, to Patricia.

Filmography

As writer 

 Edith – original screenplay from researched notes.
 A Spy for a Spy – Screenplay adapted from the novel The Springers in collaboration with author Berkeley Mather.
 The Sweetwater Point Motel – Screenplay adapted from the novel of the same name by Peter Saab.
 The Tangled Web – Screenplay adapted fram the novel The Molester by Lee Sarokin.
 Spy Now, Pay Later – Original screenplay in collaboration with Carl Johnson and Karl-Heinz Willschrei.
  (TV Series) – Additional material and rewrites for seven episodes.

Feature films as director/producer 
While the Sun Shines (1947) – sound editor
Warning to Wantons (1949) – editor
Stop Press Girl (1949) – editor
Prelude to Fame (1950) – editor
White Corridors (1951) – editor
Never Take No for an Answer (1951) aka The Small Miracle – editor
Something Money Can't Buy (1952) – editor
Deadly Nightshade (directed by John Gilling, 1953) – editor
Recoil (directed by John Gilling, 1953) – editor
Romeo and Juliet (1954) – editor
Passage Home (directed by Roy Ward Baker, 1955) – editor
A Town Like Alice (1956) – editor
Triple Deception (1956) aka House of Secrets – editor
High Tide at Noon (1957) – editor
The One That Got Away (directed by Roy Ward Baker 1957) – editor
 A Night to Remember (directed by Roy Ward Baker, 1958) – 2nd Unit Director/Film Editor
Tiger Bay (directed by J. Lee Thompson, 1959) – editor
 Violent Moment (1959) aka Rebound – director, editor
 Operation Amsterdam (directed by Michael McCarthy, 1959) – 2nd Unit Director
The White Trap (1959) – director
 Circus of Horrors (1960) – Director, editor
The Malpas Mystery (1960) – director
 Payroll (1961) aka I Promised to Pay – Director
Echo of Barbara (1961) – director
 Night of the Eagle (US: Burn Witch Burn, 1962) – Director
 This Is My Street (1963) – Director
The Human Jungle (1963–64) (TV series) - director
 Three Hats for Lisa (1965) (Musical) – Director
 The Trap (1966) – Director
 Finders Keepers (1966) – Director
The Avengers (1965–67) (TV series) – director, 2nd unit director
 The Southern Star (1969) – Director
 Mister Jerico (1970) (TV) – Director 
 Assault (1971) aka In the Devil's Garden – Director
 The Firechasers (1971) – Director
 Revenge (1971) aka Inn of the Frightened People – Director
Shirley's World (1971) (TV series) – director
The Persuaders! (1971–72) (TV series) – director
 All Coppers Are... (1972) – Director
Arthur of the Britons (1972–73) (TV series) – director
The Zoo Gang (1974) (TV series) – director
 Deadly Strangers (1974) – Co-Producer/Director
 What Changed Charley Farthing? (1974) aka The Bananas Boat – Co-Producer/Director
 Diagnosis: Murder (1975) – Co-Producer/Director
 One Away (1976) – Co-Producer/Director
The New Avengers (1976–77) (TV series) - director
 A Bridge Too Far (directed by Richard Attenborough, 1977) – Director of action sequences
The Professionals (1977–78) (TV series) – director, producer
The Famous Five (1978–79) (TV series) – director, producer
The Hardy Boys/Nancy Drew Mysteries (1979) (TV series) – director
The Last Convertible (1979) (mini series) – director
The Seekers (1979) (mini series) – Director
Galactica 1980 (1980) (TV series) – director
Condominium (1980) – Director
The Misadventures of Sheriff Lobo (1981) (TV series) – director
The Fall Guy (1981) (TV series) – director
The Greatest American Hero (1981) (TV series) – director
Magnum, P.I. (1981) (TV series) – director
Terror at Alcatraz (1982) (TV movie) – director
Knight Rider (1982–86) (TV series) – director
Remington Steele (1982–83) (TV series) – director
The Family Tree (1983) (TV series) – director
Philip Marlowe, Private Eye (1983) (TV series) – director
Manimal (1983) (TV series) – director
Masquerade (1983–84) (TV series) – director
The Master (1984) (TV series) – director
T.J. Hooker (1984) (TV series) – director
Cover Up (1984–85) (TV series) – director
Hardcastle and McCormick (1985) (TV series) – director
Airwolf (1985) (TV series) – director
Hunter (1985) (TV series) – director
The A-Team (1985–86) (TV series) – director
Scarecrow and Mrs. King (1986–87) (TV series) – director
Werewolf (1987) (TV series) – director
Blue Blood (1988–89) (TV series) – director
Dragnet (1990) (TV series) – director
They Came from Outer Space (1990) (TV series) – director
The New Adam-12 (1991) (TV series) – director
Super Force (1991–92) (TV series) – director
Tarzán (1992–95) (TV series) – director
Baywatch (1993) (TV series) – director
Acapulco H.E.A.T. (1993–94) (TV series) – director, writer
Space Precinct (1994–95) (TV series) – director
CI5: The New Professionals (1995) (TV series) – director

References

External links 
 

1921 births
2000 deaths
British film directors
British television directors
Deaths from cancer in Spain
Film people from Edinburgh
Television people from Edinburgh